Sam Kieth (born January 11, 1963) is an American comics artist and writer, best known as the creator of The Maxx and Zero Girl.

Career

Comics
Kieth's first published work was "a story in the back of a Comico comic" when he was "about seventeen"; it was "about a killer rabbit named Max the Hare". He came to prominence in 1984 as the inker of Matt Wagner's Mage, and a year later as the inker of Fish Police. In 1989, he penciled the first five issues (the "Preludes & Nocturnes" story arc) of writer Neil Gaiman's celebrated series The Sandman and collaborated with Alan Grant on a Penguin story in Secret Origins Special #1. He illustrated two volumes of writer William Messner-Loebs' Epicurus the Sage, drew an Aliens miniseries for Dark Horse Comics, and drew The Incredible Hulk #368, which led to drawing numerous covers for Marvel Comics Presents.

In 1993, Kieth left Marvel to create the original series The Maxx for fledgling publisher Image Comics. The Maxx ran 35 issues, all of which were plotted and illustrated by Kieth. William Messner-Loebs scripted #1–15 and Alan Moore wrote #21. In 1995, The Maxx was adapted as part of MTV's short-lived animation series MTV's Oddities, which included Eric Fogel's The Head.

After taking a break from comics to pursue other interests, Kieth created the series Zero Girl for DC Comics' Wildstorm imprint in 2001. He followed that with the drama Four Women later that year and Zero Girl: Full Circle in 2003. In August 2004, he launched the Scratch series featuring a teenage werewolf.

Kieth then wrote and drew the five-issue series Batman: Secrets, featuring the Joker, and Batman/Lobo: Deadly Serious, a two-issue miniseries starting in August 2007. This was followed by 2009's Lobo: Highway to Hell, written by Scott Ian of the band Anthrax, and the painted story "Ghosts", which appeared in Batman Confidential #40–43. In 2010, Kieth wrote and illustrated the original hardcover graphic novel Arkham Asylum: Madness, which spent two weeks on The New York Times Best Seller list, reaching number five in the category of "Hardcover Graphic Books".

Ojo comprises the first, and My Inner Bimbo the second, in a cycle of original limited series or graphic novels published by Oni Press, which he dubbed "The Trout-a-Verse". The cycle concerned the intertwined lives of Annie (Ojo), Lo (My Inner Bimbo), Dana, Nola, Otto, and others all connected by an encounter with an urban legend known as the Magic Trout.

In the UK, he has contributed to 2000 AD'''s Judge Dredd and provided several covers for the Nemesis the Warlock reprint title. In 2011, Kieth began drawing IDW Publishing's 30 Days of Night series. IDW released the 48-page The Sam Kieth Sketchbooks: Vol. 1, followed by a second volume in August 2010.

Other media
In addition to co-producing The Maxx animated series for MTV, Kieth co-wrote "No Smoking", the pilot to Cow and Chicken (created by his cousin, David Feiss), and directed the film Take It to the Limit (2000) for Roger Corman's Concorde-New Horizons.

Personal life
Kieth began living with his future wife when he was 15 years old and she was 20 years older than him.

Awards
Sam Kieth received an Inkpot Award at the San Diego Comic-Con in 2013.

Bibliography
AfterShock Comics
 Eleanor & the Egret (2017)

Comico Comics
 Primer #5 (writer/artist) (first published art) (1983)
 Justice Machine #11 (inker) (1987)
 Mage #10–15 (inker) (1985–1986)

Dark Horse Comics
 Aliens: Earth War #1–4 (1990)

DC Comics

 Arkham Asylum: Madness HC (writer/artist) (2010)
 Batman Confidential #40–43 (writer/artist) (2010)
 Batman/Lobo: Deadly Serious #1–2 (writer/artist) (2007)
 Batman: Secrets #1–5 (writer/artist) (2006)
 Batman/The Maxx: Arkham Dreams #1 (2018)
 Batman: Through the Looking Glass HC (2012)
 Harley Quinn vol. 2 #0 (2014)
 House of Mystery vol. 2 #23 (2010)
 Infinity, Inc. #49 (inker) (1988)
 Lobo: Highway to Hell #1–2 (2010)
 Manhunter #1–3, 12 (inker) (1988–1989)
 The Sandman vol. 1 #1–5 (1989)
 Scratch #1–5 (writer/artist) (2004)
 Secret Origins Special #1 (1989)
 T.H.U.N.D.E.R. Agents vol. 2 #4 (2012)

Piranha Press
 Epicurus the Sage #1–2 (1989–1991)
 Fast Forward #3 (1993)

WildStorm
 Epicurus the Sage TPB (2003)
 Four Women #1–5 (writer/artist) (2001–2002)
 Zero Girl #1–5 (writer/artist) (2001)
 Zero Girl: Full Circle #1–5 (writer/artist) (2003)

Eclipse Comics
 Adolescent Radioactive Black Belt Hamsters #6–8 (1987)

Fantagraphics Books
 Critters #7, 11–12, 23 (writer/artist) (1986–1987), #21 (cover art) (1988)

Fishwrap Productions
 Fish Police #1 (inker and pin-up) (1985)

Image Comics
 Darker Image #1 (plotter/artist) (1993)
 Friends of Maxx #1–3 (1996–1997)
 The Maxx #1–35 (plotter/artist) (1993–1998)
 Sam Stories: Legs (writer/artist) (1999)

Marvel Comics

 Clive Barker's Hellraiser #12 (1992)
 Freddy Krueger's A Nightmare On Elm Street #2 (back cover pin-up) (1989)
 The Incredible Hulk #368 (artist) (1990)
 Marvel Age #105 (cover art and interview with reprinted art) (1991)
 Marvel Comics Presents #85–92, 100, 117–122 (cover and art); #94–99 and 101–111 (cover only) (1991–1993)
 Peter Parker: Spider-Man vol. 2 #56–57 (2003)
 Savage Hulk #1 (1996)
 Wolverine/Hulk #1–4 (writer/artist) (2002)
 X-Men Unlimited #9 (2005)

Oni Press
 Ojo #1–5 (2004–2005)
 My Inner Bimbo'' #1–5 (2006–2008)

References

External links
 
 
 Sam Kieth at Mike's Amazing World of Comics
 Sam Kieth at the Unofficial Handbook of Marvel Comics Creators

1963 births
20th-century American artists
21st-century American artists
American comics artists
American comics writers
DC Comics people
Inkpot Award winners
Living people
Marvel Comics people
Place of birth missing (living people)